Bernald Alfaro Alfaro (born 26 January 1997) is a Costa Rican professional footballer who plays as a midfielder for Liga FPD club Alajuelense on loan from Carmelita, and the Costa Rica national team.

Club career
A youth academy graduate of Carmelita, Alfaro made his professional debut on 6 May 2015 in a 2–3 league defeat against Saprissa. On 23 May 2019, Alajuelense announced the loan signing of Alfaro for three seasons. In February 2020, he extended his loan contract with the club until June 2024.

International career
Alfaro has represented Costa Rica at different age level tournaments. He was part of Costa Rica U20 team for 2017 CONCACAF U-20 Championship and 2017 FIFA U-20 World Cup. He was also part of the team which won silver medal at the 2017 Central American Games.

On 1 February 2020, Alfaro made his senior debut for Costa Rica in a 0–1 friendly loss against United States.

Career statistics

International

References

External links
 

1997 births
Living people
Association football midfielders
Costa Rican footballers
Costa Rica international footballers
Costa Rica under-20 international footballers
Liga FPD players
A.D. Carmelita footballers
L.D. Alajuelense footballers
People from Alajuela
Central American Games silver medalists for Costa Rica
Central American Games medalists in football